Kamenev (masculine) or Kameneva (feminine) is a common Russian surname.  It may refer to:
Lev Kamenev, Bolshevik revolutionary and a prominent Soviet politician
Lev Lvovich Kamenev, Russian landscape painter
Olga Kameneva, Soviet politician, Lev Kamenev's  wife and Leon Trotsky's sister
Sergey Kamenev, Soviet military leader
Gavriil Kamenev, Russian poet
Vladislav Kamenev, Russian hockey player
Alex Kamenev, Russian theoretical physicist
Lieutenant Kamenev, an antagonist in As Far as My Feet Will Carry Me
Piotr Ilyich Kamenev, the Premier of the Soviet Union in The Shoes of the Fisherman

See also 
 Kamenev Bight
 Kamenev Nunatak